Metro M1 is a Czech type of metro train, which is used on line C of the Prague Metro. These Metro trains were made by the companies ČKD, Siemens and ADTranz mainly from 2000 to 2003 and were developed especially for Prague. These metro trains replaced the metro 81-71M.

Description

The Metro M1 train consists of five units. Because of differences in the technical equipment of each car, the train is indivisible. It is driven by asynchronous motors with microprocessor control, in contrast to the motors used in Soviet trains. The train has a central control system that allows the train crew, data collection and evaluation, including diagnostics. Maximum capacity of one car is 48 seats (40 for the first and last car) for sitting and 252 standing places (242 for the first and last car).

The metro runs automatically, the driver only ensures the door opening and closing and reporting of stations. The metro is checked from the central dispatching of the Prague metro.
Train service life is estimated at thirty years. The designer of the trains is Ing. Arch. Patrik Kotas.

M1 in Prague

Metro M1 has been developed as a light rail of the new millennium. In 1995, a contract for the delivery of M1 trains was signed between the companies Siemens, ADTranz, ČKD and Prague Transport Company (DPP). The first train appeared in Prague in July 1998 within test operation. Main serial production took place between 2000 and 2003. Since 2003, this type is the only train in use on line C. In 2003, 40 units operated on this line. Further deliveries of M1 took place in response to the extension of line C in 2004 and 2008. These trains were made only by Siemens, without ČKD and ADTranz.

Currently, there are 53 M1 trains in Prague, further deliveries are not planned. In the morning rush hour 42 metro trains are in operation, the minimum interval between 2 trains is 90 seconds.

M1 in Maracaibo
As well as in Prague, for which it was specially developed, the M1 also runs in Maracaibo, Venezuela. In Maracaibo, trains only have three cars and green-white paint, and use overhead lines instead of third rail.

Gallery

References
 Summary information
 Prague Transport Company - technical specification
 Article
 Web of the Patrik Kotas
 Prague Transport Company - vizualization

Electric multiple units of the Czech Republic
Prague Metro
750 V DC multiple units